Nail or Nails is the surname of:

 Bethanie Nail (born 1956), Australian retired runner
 Bobby Nail (1925-1995), American bridge player
 David Nail (born 1979), American country music singer-songwriter
 Jimmy Nail (born 1954), English actor and singer
 John E. Nail (1883–1947), African-American real estate agent
 Debra Nails (born 1950), American philosophy professor and classics scholar
 Jamie Nails (born 1977), American former National Football League player

See also
 Bernard Le Nail (1946–2010), French writer and Breton militant